Satish Singh (born 10 November 1993 in Uttarpara) is an Indian professional footballer who plays as a right back for Mohun Bagan in the I-League. Currently Satish is playing for Delhi Premier League .

Career

Early career
Born in Uttarpara, Satish is a product of the Uttarpara Football Coaching Center where he used to train under Bastab Roy. Satish joined Bhawanipore F.C. in 2010 where he played 2 seasons. He was part of the squad that helped Bhawanipore to reach the Premier Division of the Calcutta Football League.

Churchill Brothers
Singh made his debut for Churchill Brothers S.C. on 19 January 2013 during an I-League match against East Bengal F.C. at the Salt Lake Stadium in Kolkata, West Bengal in which he came on as an 89th-minute substitute for Steven Dias; Churchill Brothers won the match 3–0.

Mohun Bagan
On 5 June 2014, it was announced that Satish has signed for Mohun Bagan.

Career statistics

Club

Personal life
Jose Ramirez Barreto being his idol, Pankaj is a big fan of Cristiano Ronaldo and always supports Portugal national football team.

Honours

Club
Churchill Brothers
 I-League: 2012–13
 Federation Cup: 2013–14
Peerless
Calcutta Premier Division A
Runners-up (1): 2018–19

References

1993 births
Living people
People from Hooghly district
Footballers from West Bengal
I-League players
Association football defenders
Indian footballers
Churchill Brothers FC Goa players
Mohun Bagan AC players